Night Beat, sometimes spelled Nightbeat, is an NBC radio drama series that aired February 6, 1950–September 25, 1952, sponsored by Pabst Blue Ribbon Beer and Wheaties.

Description 

Frank Lovejoy starred as Randy Stone, a reporter who covered the night beat for the Chicago Star, encountering criminals, eccentrics, and troubled souls. Listeners were invited to join Stone as he "searches through the city for the strange stories waiting for him in the darkness."  Most episodes leaned towards suspense, crime and thriller themes, but Night Beat also featured occasional humorous or sentimental stories. Each episode ended with Stone at his desk as he finished typing a news story based on his latest exploits, and shouting for the copy boy to deliver his story to an editor. 

Radio historian John Dunning described Night Beat as a "superior series", carried by vivid writing and Lovejoy's sympathetic performance.

Ripperologist editor Paul Begg offered this description of the series:

Supporting actors included Joan Banks, Parley Baer, William Conrad, Jeff Corey, Lawrence Dobkin, Paul Frees, Jack Kruschen, Peter Leeds, Howard McNear, Lurene Tuttle, Martha Wentworth, and Ben Wright. The announcer was Donald Rickles.

Other media

Television 
The format was recreated, with Lovejoy as Stone, on an episode of the television anthology series, Four Star Playhouse ("Search in the Night" 5 November 1953). This episode was a television pilot produced by Four Star Productions for a proposed, but ultimately unproduced, weekly television series.

Prose 
In December 2012, Old Time Radio distributor Radio Archives published Nightbeat: Night Stories, an ebook anthology of six new Nightbeat stories. Authors included were Howard Hopkins, Paul Bishop, Will Murray, Tommy Hancock (who also served as editor), Mark Squirek, and Bobby Nash. Each story used the traditional radio opening and closing, as well as Stone's first-person narration. Several characters from the radio series appear, and Hancock's entry – "Lucky" – attempts to explain who "Lucky" Stone from the original pilot really is.

Nightbeat: Night Stories was also released as an audiobook, read by Michael C. Gwynne.

See also 

 Bright Star
 Ford Theater

References

External links 
 
 Night Beat episodes online from Old Time Radio Researchers Group library
 Jerry Haendiges Vintage Radio Logs: Night Beat

1950s American radio programs
American radio dramas
NBC radio programs